Andrey Sergeyevich Yepishin (born 10 June 1981 in Zhukovsky) is a Russian athlete specializing in the 100 metres.

Career 
He won a silver medal in 4 x 100 metres relay at the 2003 Summer Universiade. Participating in the 2004 Summer Olympics, he achieved fifth place in his 100 metres heat, thus failing to make it through to the second round. He also participated on the Russian relay team, which finished last. The next year Yepishin finished fifth at the European Indoor Championships, and won a silver medal at the Universiade in İzmir.

In 2006 he finished second in the 60 metres at the World Indoor Championships in Moscow to clock a new personal best and national record time of 6.52 seconds. He won the silver medal in the 100 m at the 2006 European Athletics Championships and recorded a new national record of 10.10 seconds.

He finished seventh at the 2006 IAAF World Cup, and eighth at the 2008 World Indoor Championships. At the 2008 Olympic Games he placed 2nd in his heat after Derrick Atkins in a time of 10.34 seconds. He qualified for the second round in which he improved his time to 10.25 seconds. However, he was unable to qualify for the semi finals as he finished in 6th place of his heat.

Personal bests 
100m : 10.10(Gothenburg 2006)

References

External links 
 

1981 births
Living people
Russian male sprinters
Olympic male sprinters
Olympic athletes of Russia
Athletes (track and field) at the 2004 Summer Olympics
Athletes (track and field) at the 2008 Summer Olympics
Universiade silver medalists for Russia
Universiade medalists in athletics (track and field)
Medalists at the 2003 Summer Universiade
Medalists at the 2005 Summer Universiade
World Athletics Indoor Championships medalists
European Athletics Championships medalists
Russian Athletics Championships winners
People from Zhukovsky, Moscow Oblast
Sportspeople from Moscow Oblast
21st-century Russian people